Yekaterina Khramenkova (born October 16, 1956) is a retired long-distance runner from Belarus, best known for winning the bronze medal for the Soviet Union in the women's marathon at the 1986 European Championships (Stuttgart, West Germany). She was the winner of the 1992 Madrid Marathon. She is the Belarusian record holder in the 10,000 metres and 10 km.

Achievements

References
1987 Year Rankings

1956 births
Living people
Belarusian female long-distance runners
Soviet female long-distance runners
European Athletics Championships medalists
World Athletics Championships athletes for the Soviet Union